Mai Mas'ud Amin Fahmi Mohamed (born 4 April 1990) is an Egyptian synchronized swimmer who competed in the 2008 Summer Olympics and 2012 Summer Olympics.

Personal life
Mohamed was born on 4 April 1990 in Cairo, Egypt.

Synchronised swimming
Mohamed made her Olympic debut at the 2008 Summer Olympics, placing 8th in the Team event. In 2012, Mohamed competed at the 2012 Summer Olympics, placing 7th in the Team event.

References

1990 births
Living people
Egyptian synchronized swimmers
Olympic synchronized swimmers of Egypt
Synchronized swimmers at the 2008 Summer Olympics
Synchronized swimmers at the 2012 Summer Olympics